The 1842 Connecticut gubernatorial election was held on April 4, 1842. Former Speaker of the Connecticut House of Representatives and Democratic nominee Chauncey Fitch Cleveland was elected, defeating incumbent governor and Whig nominee William W. Ellsworth with 49.94% of the vote.

Cleveland won a plurality of the vote, but fell just short of a majority, by 107 votes. The state constitution at the time required the Connecticut General Assembly decide the election if no candidate won a majority of the vote. The state legislature voted 139 to 68 to elect Cleveland the governor.

This was the first appearance of the Liberty Party in a Connecticut governor's race, and the first of Francis Gillette's ten attempts at seeking the governorship.

General election

Candidates
Major party candidates

Chauncey Fitch Cleveland, Democratic
William W. Ellsworth, Whig

Minor party candidates

Francis Gillette, Liberty

Results

References

1842
Connecticut
Gubernatorial